The history of lions in Europe is based on fossils of Pleistocene and Holocene lions excavated in Europe since the early 19th century.
The first lion fossil was excavated in southern Germany, and described by Georg August Goldfuss using the scientific name Felis spelaea. It probably dates to the Würm glaciation, and is 191,000 to 57,000 years old.
Older lion skull fragments were excavated in Germany and described by Wilhelm von Reichenau under Felis fossilis in 1906. These are estimated at between 621,000 and 533,000 years old.
The modern lion (Panthera leo) inhabited parts of Southern Europe since the early Holocene.

Historical literature, such as the Iliad of ancient Greece, features lion similes.

Characteristics
Bone fragments of fossil spelaea lions indicate that they were bigger than the modern lion and had less specialized lower teeth, reduced lower premolars and smaller incisors.

As indicated by numerous artistic depictions, modern lions in the Balkans had less developed manes, and lacked abdominal and lateral manes as well as limb hair. Οn the other hand, lions from Transcaucasia exhibited all these features.

Distribution

Pleistocene records
The oldest fossils excavated near Pakefield in the United Kingdom are estimated at 680,000 years old, and represent Panthera leo fossilis.
Lion fossils were excavated in Spain, Portugal, Italy, Belgium, France, United Kingdom, Germany, Poland, Czech Republic, Slovakia, Hungary and Russia.

Late Pleistocene Panthera spelaea bone fragments were radiocarbon dated to between the Weichselian glaciation and the Holocene, and are between 109,000 and 14,000 years old. This lion was widely distributed from the Iberian peninsula, Southeast Europe, across most of northern Eurasia into Alaska. In Eurasia, it became extinct between 14,900 and 14,100 years ago, and survived in Beringia until 13,800 to 13,300 years ago.

Holocene records
The earliest Holocene lion remains to date were excavated in Basque Country, Spain, and are about 11,600–9,000 years old, although the dating is only context-dated and therefore regarded as not too accurate. Moreover, there are doubts if this was a modern lion or a late surviving P. spelaea cave lion. Other early Holocene lion finds, come from different places of Italy and are dated to 12,000-9,000 years old.

A neolithic lion tooth fragment representing the Atlantic Period was found in Karanovo, Bulgaria, and is estimated 6,000 years old.
In Greece lions first appeared around 6,500–6,000 years ago as indicated by a front leg bone found in Philippi. Bone fragments of the modern lion were excavated in Hungary and in Ukraine's Black Sea region, which are estimated at around 5,500 to 3,000 years old. Remains were also found in Romania and European Turkey.

Historic range of Panthera leo
In Southeast Europe, the lion inhabited part of the Balkan Peninsula, up to Hungary and Ukraine during the Neolithic period. It survived in Bulgaria until the 4th or 3rd century BC. Around 1000 BC, it became extinct in the Peloponnese. It disappeared from Macedonia around the first century AD, from Western Thrace not before the 2nd century AD and from Thessaly possibly in the 4th century AD; Themistius regretted that no more lions could be furnished for beast-shows.

In Transcaucasia, the lion was present until the 10th century. The peak of its historic range covered all of the plains and foothills of eastern Transcaucasia, westward almost to Tbilisi in modern Georgia. Northwards, its range extended through the eastern Caucasus, from the Apsheron Peninsula to the mouth of the Samur River near the current Azerbaijan-Russia border, extending to the Araks river. From there, the boundary of its range narrowly turned east to Yerevan in modern Armenia, with its northern boundary then extending westward to Turkey.

In culture

Lions feature in ancient Greek mythology and writings, including the myth of the Nemean lion, which was believed to be a supernatural lion that occupied the sacred town of Nemea in the Peloponnese. Homer mentioned lions 45 times in his poems, but this could have been due to his experience in Asia Minor.
Phalaecus, a tyrant of Amvrakia (modern-day Arta), was allegedly killed by a female lion due to his holding a newborn lion cub, after finding it on a hunting expedition. Conon refers to the myth of how Olynthus city got its name, when during around the period of the Trojan War, son of Strymon, Olynthos during a lion hunt was killed by a lion. According to Herodotus lions occurred between Achelous river and Nestus, being plentiful between Akanthos and Thermi. When Xerxes advanced near Echedorus in 480 BC, the troops' camels were attacked by lions. Xenophon stated around 400 BC that lions were hunted around Mount Kissos, Pangaio, the Pindus mountains and elsewhere. Aristotle in the 4th century BC provided some data on lion distribution, behaviour, breeding and also anatomy. According to him, lions were more numerous in North Africa than in Europe; they had approached towns, and attacked people only if they were old, or had poor dental health. Pliny the Elder mentions that European lions were stronger compared to those from Syria and Africa. In the 2nd century AD, Pausanias referred to lion presence east of Nestus in Thrace, in the area of Abdera. He also referred to a story about Polydamas of Skotoussa, an Olympic winner in the 5th century BC, who allegedly used his bare hands to kill a lion on Thessalian part of Mount Olympus; and to one about Caranus of Macedon who according to the Macedonians, raised a trophy that was thrown down and destroyed by a lion that was rushing down from Mount Olympus.

The Romans used Barbary lions from North Africa for lion-baiting, and lions from Greece for gladiatorial games.

Assassin’s Creed: Odyssey, a 2018 video game set during a fictionalized version of the Peloponnesian War (431 - 422 B.C.E.), depicts lions as a threatening form of wildlife in several areas of Ancient Greece.

See also
 Panthera leo leo
 Asiatic lion
 Cape lion
 Barbary lion
 Panthera atrox
 Cultural depictions of lions

References

External links
 Panthera leo europaea
 The Last European Lion